(born January 27, 1953 in Higashiōsaka) is a professor at the Department of Host Defense, Osaka University, Japan. He has made ground-breaking discoveries in the field of immunology, most significantly in the area of innate host defense mechanisms.

Education
Shizuo Akira gained a M.D. in School of Medicine from Osaka University in 1977. In 1984 he earned a PhD from Osaka University. Till 1987, he did post-doctoral research at University of California, Berkeley.

Research
Besides being one of the world's most-cited scientists, he has also been recognised, in the years 2006 and 2007, for having published the greatest number of ‘Hot Papers’ (11 papers) over the preceding two years. He is the recipient of several international awards, including the Gairdner Foundation International Award (2011), Robert Koch Prize, the Milstein Award (2007), and the William B. Coley Award.

Among his greatest discoveries is the demonstration, through the ablation of toll-like receptor (TLR)s genes, that TLRs recognize a discrete collection of molecules of microbial origin, and later the RNA helicases, RIG-I (retinoic-acid-inducible protein I) and MDA5 (melanoma differentiation-associated protein 5). All molecules belong to the pattern recognition receptors, which detects intruding pathogens and initiates antimicrobial responses in the host.

Career history
 Clinical Training and Physician (1977-1980)
 Research Fellow, University of California, Berkeley (1985-1987)
 Research Associate (1987-1995), Associate Professor (1995), Institute for Molecular and Cellular Biology, Osaka University
 Professor, Hyogo College of Medicine (1996-1999)
 Professor, Research Institute for Microbial Diseases, Osaka University (1999–present)
 Center Director, Osaka University Immunology Frontier Research Center (2007–present)

Recognition
2000     Inoue Prize for Science (Inoue Foundation of Science)
2001     Hideyo Noguchi Prize (Osaka Science & Technology)
2002     Osaka Science Prize (Osaka Science & Technology)
2003     Takeda Medical Prize (Takeda Science Foundation) 
2004     Prize of Princess Takamatsu Cancer Research Fund 
2004     Robert Koch Prize (Robert Koch Foundation, Germany)
2005     The Emperor's Purple Ribbon Medal (Japanese Cabinet Office)
2006     Asahi Prize (Asahi Shinbun)
2006     William B. Coley Award (Cancer Research Institute, United States)
2007     "Hottest Researcher" Thompson Scientific Research Award 
2007     Uehara Prize (Uehara Memorial Foundation)
2007     Imperial Prize and Japan Academy Prize (academics) (Japan Academy)
2007     Milstein Award (International Society for Interferon and Cytokine Research)
2007     Dunham lecture at Harvard University
2007     Doctor of Medical Science at Technical University of Munich
2008     Dyer Lecture (National Institute of Health)
2009     Marsh Lecture (Feinstein Institutes for Medical Research)
2009     Lacey Lecture (Washington University in St. Louis)
2009     Foreign associate, National Academy of Sciences
2009     Person of Cultural Merit (Japanese Government)
2009     Hans Bloemendal Medal (University of Nijmegen, Netherland)
2010     Avery-Landsteiner Prize (German Society for Immunology)
2010     Keio Medical Science Prize
2010     Lifetime honorary member (International Endotoxin and Innate Immunity Society)
2011     The Canada Gairdner International Award
2016     Semantic Scholar AI program ranked Akira as #4 on its list of most influential biomedical researchers.

Missing and rescued 
In July 2021, Akira went missing while climbing Kannon peak in Tenkawa, Nara Prefecture, on his own. He was found and rescued by police with the help of a police dog.

References

External links

 

1953 births
Living people
Japanese immunologists
People from Higashiōsaka
Osaka University alumni
Academic staff of Osaka University
Laureates of the Imperial Prize
Foreign associates of the National Academy of Sciences
Fellows of the American Academy of Microbiology